Bernard Musson (1925–2010) was a French actor.

Selected filmography
 It Happened in Paris (1952)
 The Slave (1953)
 On Trial (1954)
 Flesh and the Woman (1954)
 Bonjour sourire (1956)
 Les Truands (1956)
 Pity for the Vamps (1956)
 The Seventh Commandment (1957)
 Les Misérables (1958)
 La Vache et le Prisonnier (1959)
 All the Gold in the World  (1961)
 Le Miracle des loups (1961)
 Les Lions sont lâchés (1961)
 Charade 1963
 The Bread Peddler (1963)
 Diary of a Chambermaid (1964)
 Une souris chez les hommes (1964)
 Les amitiés particulières (1964)
 Belle de Jour (1966)
 Action Man (1967)
 Le clan des siciliens (1969)
 La Vampire Nue (1970)
 Children of Mata Hari (1970)
 Peau d'Âne (1970)
 The Discreet Charm of the Bourgeoisie (1972)
 The Day of the Jackal (1973) as Usher at the Elysée Palace (uncredited)
 Le Magnifique (1973)
 La dernière bourrée à Paris (1973)
 The Phantom of Liberty (1974)
 Comme un pot de fraises (1974)
 The Porter from Maxim's (1976)
 That Obscure Object of Desire (1977)
 One Two Two (1978)
 Lucie Aubrac (1997)

External links 
 
 Fragments d'un dictionnaire amoureux

1925 births
2010 deaths
French male film actors
French male television actors